Charles Norton Felton (January 1, 1832September 13, 1914) was an American banker and politician who served as a Congressman (1885 to 1889) and U.S. Senator (1891 to 1893) from California in the late 19th Century, in addition to co-founding the progenitor of the Chevron Corporation.

Biography

Charles Felton was born on January 1, 1832, in Buffalo, New York. He attended and received his education from Syracuse Academy before studying law and being admitted to the bar; however, he never entered practice. Felton moved to California in 1849 and entered the mercantile business and subsequently banking. In 1853, he became sheriff of Yuba County, California. Felton served as a tax collector before being appointed as treasurer of the United States Mint at San Francisco. From 1868 to 1877, he served as Assistant Treasurer of the United States. Felton also served in the California State Assembly from 1878 to 1882.

In 1884, he was elected to the United States House of Representatives as a Republican for the 49th Congress. He subsequently won reelection to his seat in 1886 for the 50th Congress. He did not seek election to a third term in the U.S. House in 1888; he served from March 1885 to March 1889.

Felton was elected to the United States Senate in 1891 to represent California to fill the vacancy caused by the death of George Hearst, serving from March 19, 1891, to March 3, 1893. He did not seek reelection.

Upon retiring from the U.S. Senate, Felton served as a state prison director from 1903 to 1907. He died at his home in Menlo Park, California, on September 13, 1914. Felton was interred in Cypress Lawn Cemetery in Colma, California.

The town of Felton, California was named after him.

References

Sources

External links

 

1832 births
1914 deaths
Republican Party United States senators from California
People from Menlo Park, California
Republican Party members of the United States House of Representatives from California
19th-century American politicians
Burials at Cypress Lawn Memorial Park